Fit as a Fiddle may refer to:

"Fit as a Fiddle" (song) 1932
Fit as a Fiddle (album) by Natalie MacMaster 1997 
Fit as a Fiddle, album by Danish jazz violinist Svend Asmussen 1999
Fit as a Fiddle, 1952 keep-fit documentary with Joe Robinson (actor)  
Fit as a Fiddle, 1980s sketch in the sketch series Hee Haw with Gailard Sartain